The 2014 Georgia gubernatorial election took place on November 4, 2014, to elect the Governor of Georgia, concurrently with the election to Georgia's Class II U.S. Senate seat, as well as other elections to the United States Senate in other states and elections to the United States House of Representatives and various state and local elections.

Incumbent Republican Governor Nathan Deal was re-elected to serve a second term in office by a margin of 7.8%. He turned back two primary challengers and in the general election, defeated Democratic State Senator Jason Carter and Libertarian nominee businessman and engineer Andrew Hunt, who were unopposed in their respective primaries.

Republican primary

Candidates

Declared
 John Barge, State School Superintendent
 Nathan Deal, incumbent Governor
 David Pennington, Mayor of Dalton

Polling

Results

Democratic primary

Candidates

Declared
 Jason Carter, state senator and grandson of former president and former governor Jimmy Carter

Withdrew
 Connie Stokes, former DeKalb County Commissioner, former state senator and candidate for GA-04 in 2004 and 2010 (running for Lieutenant Governor)

Declined
 Stacey Abrams, Minority Leader of the Georgia House of Representatives
 Roy Barnes, former governor and nominee for governor in 2010
 Shirley Franklin, former mayor of Atlanta
 Scott Holcomb, state representative
 Kasim Reed, Mayor of Atlanta

Results

Libertarian primary

Candidates

Declared
 Andrew Hunt, businessman and engineer

General election

Debates
Complete video of debate, October 19, 2014 - C-SPAN
Complete video of debate, October 26, 2014 - C-SPAN

Predictions

Polling

Results

References

External links
Georgia gubernatorial election, 2014 at Ballotpedia

Official campaign websites (Archived)
Nathan Deal for Governor
Jason Carter for Governor
David Pennington for Governor
John Barge for Governor
Andrew Hunt for Governor

Gubernatorial
2014
Georgia